Sadullahpur is a village in Bihar in Vaishali district. It is located around 5 kilometer far from the nearest town Lalganj. Its panchayat is named after the village of Sadullahpur. In terms of geographical area, the village is not very large. It is expected to be about 650 acres of land acquired by the village. North border is shared by Hussaina and Amritpur whereas South border is shared by Jaitipur and Sarariya.  The village is having its own Post Office with Pin Code  844121.

The village also have a primary school (for which land was donated by the first Mukhiya of this Panchayat Sri Suresh Prasad Singh) . The village comes under Lalganj Vidhan Shabha Constituency No. 124 and its Lokshabha constituency is Hajipur. Dr. Akhileshwar Prasad Sinha, a famous urologist in Patna, hails from this village. In past the village had played a very crucial role during the election time due to influential person in the village like Suresh Prasad Singh a very close friend of Veteran Congress leader Laliteshwar Prasad Shahi. 
During the formation of Panchayat Sri Suresh Prasad Singh was nominated 2 times for Mukhiya due his honesty and popularity in the people. He also own so much of land in his village and his ancestors gave land to many landless people to stay in village. Bhumihar is the major caste in this village, however there are other castes in the village as well.
People of this village are mostly dependent on agriculture for their survival. There are many government employees well settled in this village from the various government departments.

Direction Board

References

Villages in Vaishali district